Acacia stanleyi, commonly known as Stanley's rock wattle, is a shrub belonging to the genus Acacia and the subgenus Juliflorae that is endemic to south western Australia.

Description
It has sub-glabrous branchlets and phyllodes that run continuously along with the branchlets. The phyllodes are generally shallowly incurved and green in colour but turn grey once they die, they have eight longitudinal nerves with deep grooves between the nerves. It blooms from August to September producing yellow flowers. The simple inflorescences are  cylindrically shaped flower-spikes packed with golden coloured flowers. Following flowering thinly coriaceous and glabrous seed pods that resemble a string of beads form.

Distribution
It is native to a small area in the  Wheatbelt region of Western Australia. It has only a very limited distribution and is known from only two populations that are located to the north and north east of Kalannie where it is usually situated on and around granite outcrops growing in hard, gritty, sandy loam soils as a part of open woodland communities.

See also
List of Acacia species

References

stanleyi
Acacias of Western Australia
Taxa named by Bruce Maslin
Plants described in 2007